Sir Bruce Small Park is a sporting facility located in Benowa, a suburb of the Gold Coast, Queensland in Australia. Its baseball facilities are home to the Surfers Paradise Baseball Club, current premiers of the Greater Brisbane League. It has hosted many high-profile Australian baseball events such as the Masters Games and University Games.

The adjacent oval is home to the Surfers Paradise-Benowa Cricket Club and Surfers Paradise Australian Football Club, which plays in the QAFL.

It is named after former Gold Coast mayor Sir Bruce Small.

See also

Sports on the Gold Coast, Queensland

References

External links
Aerial View of Sir Bruce Small Park
Pan Pacific Masters Games on the Gold Coast

Baseball venues in Australia
Australian rules football grounds
Cricket grounds in Australia
Sports venues on the Gold Coast, Queensland
North East Australian Football League grounds